Fire from the Tomb is the third studio album by Christian metal band War of Ages, but it is a re-recording of their debut album, the self-titled War of Ages. "The Awakening" is the only song on the album without a previously released version of itself on earlier War of Ages releases. The album was released on July 24, 2007 on Facedown Records.

Track listing 
"Intro" – 1:33
"Stand Your Ground" – 3:53 (Music video has a guest appearance Aaron Martyr) 
"Brothers In Arms" – 4:15
"The Awakening" – 4:06
"False Prophet" – 4:40
"Only The Strong Survive" – 3:45
"My Solitude" – 3:37
"Battle On" – 5:41
"One Day" – 3:55
"Scars Of Tomorrow" – 3:24
"Broken Before You" – 3:51
"Second Chance" – 3:51

Personnel

War of Ages 
 Leroy Hamp – lead vocals
 Steve Brown – lead guitar, backing vocals
 Jonathan Lynch – rhythm guitar, backing vocals
 T.J. Alford – bass guitar, backing vocals
 Alex Hamp – drums

Production 
 Dave Quiggle - artwork

2007 albums
Facedown Records albums
War of Ages albums